The Rosenau–Hyman equation or K(n,n) equation is a KdV-like equation having compacton solutions. This nonlinear partial differential equation is of the form

 

The equation is named after Philip Rosenau and James M. Hyman, who used in their 1993 study of compactons.

The K(n,n) equation has the following traveling wave solutions:
 when a > 0

 
when a < 0

References

Nonlinear partial differential equations
Exactly solvable models